Scrobipalpa vladimiri is a moth in the family Gelechiidae. It was described by Povolný in 1966. It is found in Turkey, Lebanon and Syria.

The forewings are ashy-grey with scattered dark scales. The hindwings are light shining grey.

References

Scrobipalpa
Moths described in 1966